Colla amoena is a moth in the Bombycidae family. It was described by Paul Dognin in 1923. It is found in Brazil.

References

Natural History Museum Lepidoptera generic names catalog

Bombycidae
Moths described in 1923